Giovanni Bolzoni may refer to:
* Giovanni Bolzoni (composer) (1841–1919), Italian composer
 Giovanni Bolzoni (footballer, born 1905), Italian footballer with Inter Milan in the 1930s
 Giovanni Bolzoni (footballer, born 1937), Italian footballer with Sampdoria, Genoa and Napoli in the 1950s and 1960s on List of S.S.C. Napoli players